The Gileppe is a river in Belgium with a length of about . It is a left tributary of the Vesdre. Its source is in the High Fens of eastern Belgium. The Gileppe flows into the Vesdre between Eupen and Limbourg.

References

Rivers of the Ardennes (Belgium)
Rivers of Belgium
Rivers of Liège Province
Jalhay
Limbourg